The Psychoanalytic Quarterly is a quarterly academic journal of psychoanalysis established in 1932 and, since 2018, published by Taylor and Francis. The journal describes itself as "the oldest free-standing psychoanalytic journal in America". The current editor-in-chief is Jay Greenberg (William Alanson White Institute).

History 
The Psychoanalytic Quarterly was established by Dorian Feigenbaum, Bertram D. Lewin, Frankwood Williams, and Gregory Zilboorg. In the opening issue they described the journal's aims:

The first issue's lead article was Libidinal Types by Sigmund Freud, one of three articles by Freud translated by Edith B. Jackson and published in the journal in its first year. However, the new journal upset Ernest Jones in England, who saw it as a competitor to The International Journal of Psychoanalysis, which he edited. The new journal was also watched carefully by Smith Ely Jelliffe and William Alanson White of the National Psychological Association for Psychoanalysis, which published Psychoanalytic Review:

Abstracting and indexing 
The journal is abstracted and indexed in:

References

External links 
 
 Print: 
 Online: 

Publications established in 1932
Psychotherapy journals
Quarterly journals
English-language journals
Psychoanalysis in the United States